Richard Olney Arrington (January 21, 1897 – July 9, 1963) was a Mississippi politician and jurist. He was a justice of the Supreme Court of Mississippi from 1950 to 1963. He also was a member of the Mississippi Senate, representing the state's 11th senatorial district (Copiah County) as a Democrat from 1932 to 1940.

Biography 
Richard Olney Arrington was born on January 21, 1897, in Monticello, Mississippi. He graduated from the University of Mississippi School of Law and served in the U. S. Navy during World War I. He was a member of the Mississippi State Senate, representing the 11th district as a Democrat, from 1932 to 1940. In 1941, he became the Assistant Attorney General of Mississippi. He held that office until he was appointed by Governor Fielding Wright to the position of Associate Justice of the Supreme Court of Mississippi in September 1950. He won re-election twice in that office. While still holding the position, he died of an apparent heart attack on July 9, 1963.

References

1897 births
1963 deaths
People from Monticello, Mississippi
University of Mississippi School of Law alumni
Democratic Party Mississippi state senators
Justices of the Mississippi Supreme Court